The 2019 Finnish Athletics Championships was the year's national outdoor track and field championships for Finland. It was held on 1–4 August at the Kimpinen Sports Centre stadium in Lappeenranta. The walking events took place outside the stadium near Lappeenranta's harbour.

Results

Men

Women

References

Results
Kalevan Kisat 1.–4.8.2019 Lappeenranta – LIVE-tulospalvelu. live.time4results.com. Retrieved 2019-09-07.

External links
 Finnish Athletics Federation website

Finnish Athletics Championships
Finnish Athletics Championships
Finnish Athletics Championships
Finnish Athletics Championships
Sport in Lappeenranta